William Henderson (born November 4, 1929) was a sports shooter who represents the United States Virgin Islands. He competed in the men's 50 metre free pistol event at the 1984 Summer Olympics.

References

External links
 

1929 births
Possibly living people
United States Virgin Islands male sport shooters
Olympic shooters of the United States Virgin Islands
Shooters at the 1984 Summer Olympics
Place of birth missing (living people)